Geo Television Network is a television channel based in Pakistan. It was established in May 2002 and is owned by the Jang Media Group. The channel began its test transmission on 14 August 2002, with regular transmission beginning on 1 October 2002.

History 
Geo Network was founded in May 2002 by Mir Shakil-ur-Rahman. It started out with the launch of its flagship channel Geo News in October 2002. Hamid Mir joined the channel and became one of the first journalists to join Geo News. He started hosting the political talk show Capital Talk which is the flagship show of Geo News. The first guest at the show was Makhdoom Ameen Faheem with whom Mir discussed the 2002 Pakistan general election. After Geo News became a success, the Geo Network launched a sports channel named Geo Super in late September 2006.

Sister channels 
Geo Television Network began with Geo TV and has since launched several other Pakistan-based channels, including:

پیمرا ٹی وی لائسنس کا اجراء
جیو ٹی وی نیٹ ورک
کمپنیاں

Independent 
Newspapers Corporation 
(Pvt.) Ltd (INC)

Geo Kahani. (Pakistan Urdu)
Geo Tez. (Pakistan Urdu)

Independent Media 
Corporation (Pvt.) Ltd (IMC)

Geo News. (Pakistan Urdu)
Geo Entertainment HD. (Pakistan Urdu)

Independent Music Group (Pvt.) Ltd (IMG)

Geo Super. (Sports) (Pakistan Urdu)

Printing House, I.I. Chundrigar Road, 
Karachi

Current Channels Pakistan & Asia
 Geo Entertainment HD
 Geo News HD - news channel
 Geo Tez - headline news channel
Geo Super - a sports channel devoted mainly to cricket, with a secondary focus on boxing, football, tennis, and field hockey
 Geo Kahani - an Urdu subscription channel broadcasting old Geo Entertainment serials

Geo International Channels -Global Broadcasting 

Geo News International. UK , USA , ME , CANADA. 

Geo Entertainment. UK. 
Geo Entertainment. USA. 
Geo Entertainment. ME. 

Geo Kahani. UK. 

Geo Aag Music. UK.

Defunct Channels
 AAG TV Pakistan
 Geo English - Pakistan & UK
 Geo Tez UK

Upcoming Planning

 Geo Films (Urdu Dubbing) HD
 Geo Movies (English language) HD
 Geo World (Urdu & English language) HD
 Geo Kids HD
 Geo Music AAG 
 Geo English News HD
 Geo English Entertainment HD

Geo Dost
Geo Dost (meaning Geo Friends) is a Geo TV portal that offers news and more.

Geo Dramas

Geo Films

Geo Network has released several movies under the Geo Films banner, including:

Technical
Geo TV's broadcast facilities are based at Dubai Media City in the United Arab Emirates. Its uplink teleport station is Samacom, the uplink provider in the UAE. Geo TV is currently being aired on Paksat 1R.

Awards
 A documentary by Geo covering water scarcity in the Indus river delta won "The Special Prize of H.S.H. Prince Rainier III" at the Monte Carlo TV Festival.
 Geo was awarded a special award in 2005 at the Nouticaslo TV festival.
 On 20 April 2004, at the National Association of Broadcasters Convention in Las Vegas, Mir Ibrahim Rahman, chief executive of Geo TV, received an International Broadcast Excellence Award for the impact the channel has had on Pakistan.

Masala Lifestyle Awards

Winner
2009: Best TV Channel;  Geo TV

Controversies 
According to Declan Walsh, some militant outfits including Tehrik-i-Taliban Pakistan, Lashkar-e-Jhangvi, and Muttahida Qaumi Movement's alleged militant wing have infiltrated the Geo group that helped them in executing the murder of Wali Khan Babar and the attack on the Pakistan Navy's aviation base in 2011.

On May 10, 2017,  an article published by the agency claimed that the number of Afghan refugees living in Pakistan is about 15 million. "Government sources say that more or less 15 million non-registered Afghan refugees are living in Pakistan." This statistic is far from other internationally-accepted values of 2 to 6 million refugees.

After the terror incident on the Pakistan Stock Exchange in July 2020, the attackers' car was found in the later episode of the channel's show Deewangi and sparked a reaction from audiences due to the strange coincidence.

Ban 
In May 2014, Geo TV was banned by PEMRA for airing blasphemous content on Geo Entertainment in its morning show Utho Jago Pakistan. Protests were also made in Lahore as people said it is an unlawful ban. While on the other hand, countrywide protests were made against Geo for airing controversial content.

See also
 List of Pakistani television serials
 List of programs broadcast by Geo TV

References

External links

Geo Dost

 
Television channels and stations established in 2002
Television stations in Pakistan
Television stations in Karachi
Television networks in Pakistan
A&B Entertainment
2002 establishments in Pakistan